Muzaffar al-Din can refer to:

Gökböri, or Muzaffar ad-Din Gökböri (1154 – 1233), one of Saladins generals
Muzaffar al-Din Uzbek,  atabeg of the Eldiguzids from 1210 to 1225
Musa ibn Muhanna, or  Muzaffar al-Din Musa, (died 1341), Mamluk leader in Syria
Mozaffar ad-Din Shah Qajar (1853 – 1907),  Qajar king of Persia